Richard Sanford (born January 9, 1957) is a former American football defensive back in the NFL for the New England Patriots, and Seattle Seahawks.

He is also a Doctor of Chiropractic.

References 

1957 births
Living people
People from Rock Hill, South Carolina
Players of American football from South Carolina
American football safeties
New England Patriots players
Seattle Seahawks players
South Carolina Gamecocks football players